Below are the squads for the 1974 FIFA World Cup final tournament in West Germany. For the first time, a majority of countries (9 of 16) had players representing foreign clubs.

Group 1

West Germany
Head coach: Helmut Schön

East Germany
Head coach: Georg Buschner

Australia
Head coach:  Rale Rasic

Chile
Head coach: Luis Alamos

Group 2

Brazil
Head coach: Mário Zagallo

Scotland
Head coach: Willie Ormond

Yugoslavia
Head coach: Miljan Miljanić

Zaire
Head coach:  Blagoje Vidinić

Group 3

Netherlands
Head coach: Rinus Michels

Note that this squad is numbered alphabetically by surname, unlike traditional numbering systems where the goalkeeper has shirt number 1 and so forth. An exception was Johan Cruyff, who was given his favoured 14.

Sweden
Head coach: Georg Ericson

Uruguay
Head coach: Roberto Porta

Bulgaria
Head coach: Hristo Mladenov

Group 4

Poland
Head coach: Kazimierz Górski

Italy
Head coach: Ferruccio Valcareggi

Argentina
Head coach: Vladislao Cap

Note that this squad is numbered alphabetically by surname, with the exception of the goalkeepers which received traditional numbers 1, 12 and 21.

Haiti
Head coach: Antoine Tassy

References
 Planet World Cup website
 weltfussball.de 

FIFA World Cup squads
Squads